King Usermaatre Setepenre Shoshenq III of the 22nd Dynasty ruled for 39 years according to contemporary historical records. Two Apis Bulls were buried in the fourth and 28th years of his reign and he celebrated his Heb Sed Jubilee in his regnal year 30. He was not a son of Osorkon II but instead a grandson through his dead father prince Takelot. As he was only a grandson, his cousin Takelot II contested his succession and Egypt was divided. He married his aunt Tjesbastperu to strengthen his claim. He outlived his first five sons and was thus succeeded by his 6th son Shoshenq IV, who later died childless as well  and was succeeded by Shoshenq III's 7th son Pami.

From Shoshenq III's eighth regnal year, his reign was marked by the loss of Egypt's political unity, with the appearance of Pedubast I at Thebes. Henceforth, the kings of the 22nd Dynasty only controlled Lower Egypt. The Theban High Priest Osorkon B (the future Osorkon III) did date his activities at Thebes and (Upper Egypt) to Shoshenq III's reign, but this was solely for administrative reasons since Osorkon did not declare himself king after the death of his father, Takelot II. On the basis of Osorkon B's well known Chronicle, most Egyptologists today accept that Takelot II's 25th regnal year is equivalent to Shoshenq III's 22nd year.

Family
Shoshenq III married Djed-Bast-Es-Ankh, the daughter of Takelot, a High Priest of Ptah at Memphis, and Tjesbastperu, Osorkon II's daughter. He had at least four sons and one daughter: Ankhesen-Shoshenq, Bakennefi A, Pashedbast B, Pimay the 'Great Chief of the Ma', and Takelot C, a Generalissimo. A certain Padehebenbast may also have been another son of Shoshenq III, but this is not certain. They all appear to have predeceased their father through his nearly four-decade-long rule. Shoshenq III's third son, Pimay ('The Lion' in Egyptian), was once thought to be identical with king Pami ('The Cat' in Egyptian), but it is now believed that they are two different individuals, due to the separate orthography and meaning of their names. Instead, it was an unrelated individual named Shoshenq IV who ultimately succeeded Shoshenq III.

Shoshenq III was buried in the looted Royal Tomb NRT V at Tanis.

References

9th-century BC births
798 BC deaths
9th-century BC Pharaohs
8th-century BC Pharaohs
Pharaohs of the Twenty-second Dynasty of Egypt
Year of birth unknown